The Guildhall Art Gallery houses the art collection of the City of London, England. The museum is located in the Moorgate area of the City of London.  It is a stone building in a semi-Gothic style intended to be sympathetic to the historic Guildhall, which is adjacent and to which it is connected internally.

History
The City of London Corporation had commissioned and collected portraits since 1670, originally to hang in the Guildhall.  In the 19th and 20th centuries, the Corporation's art collections grew through gifts and bequests to include history paintings and other genres of art.

This building was destroyed in The Blitz in 1941, resulting in the loss of 164 paintings, drawings, watercolours, and prints, and 20 sculptures. It was not until 1985 that the City of London Corporation decided to redevelop the site and build a new gallery. The building was designed in a postmodern style by the British architect Richard Gilbert Scott.

The centrepiece of the collection, John Singleton Copley's huge painting depicting The Defeat of the Floating Batteries at Gibraltar, was placed in a prominent position in the entrance hall of the gallery.

Vivien Knight was head of the Gallery, from 1983 until her death in 2009.

Amphitheatre

The Guildhall complex was built on the site of London's Roman amphitheatre, and some of the remains of this are displayed in situ in a room in the basement of the art gallery.

See also
Alfred Temple, first director of the original gallery
Statue of Margaret Thatcher, Guildhall Art Gallery

References

External links 
 
 

Art museums and galleries in London
Roman London
Museums in the City of London
Museums of ancient Rome in the United Kingdom
Archaeological museums in London
Art museums established in 1885
1885 establishments in England